Ri Kwang-hyok (born 17 August 1987) is a North Korean international football player and currently plays as a defender for K'yŏnggong'ŏp. He has played in two FIFA World Cup qualifying matches.

International goals

References

External links

Ri Kwang-hyok at DPRKFootball

1987 births
Living people
2010 FIFA World Cup players
North Korean footballers
North Korea international footballers
2011 AFC Asian Cup players
Kyonggongopsong Sports Club players
Footballers at the 2010 Asian Games
Association football defenders
Asian Games competitors for North Korea